John Penn (22 February 1760 – 21 June 1834) was an English politician and writer who was the chief proprietor of the Province of Pennsylvania from 1775 to 1776.

Penn lived in Philadelphia for five years after the Revolution, from 1783 to 1788, building a country house just outside the city. He returned to Great Britain in 1789 after receiving his three-fourths portion of £130,000, the compensation for the proprietorship by the Pennsylvania government. He and his cousin, John Penn, who remained a resident in US, received compensation from Parliament for their losses in the former colony.

In 1798, he was appointed as High Sheriff of Buckinghamshire and served as a Member of Parliament (1802–1805). He was appointed in 1805, as governor of the Isle of Portland. Also a writer, he published in a variety of genres.

Life
He was born in London, England, the son of Thomas Penn and his wife Lady Juliana Fermor Penn (the daughter of Thomas Fermor, first earl of Pomfret), elder brother to Granville Penn, and a grandson of William Penn, founder of Pennsylvania. He studied at Eton College. On the death of his father in 1775, he succeeded to his father's interests, and inherited three quarters of the proprietorship of Pennsylvania. The other quarter of the proprietorship belonged to his cousin, also named John Penn, the colonial governor of the province. The Penns later lost the proprietorship as a result of the American Revolution.

In 1776, he entered Clare College, Cambridge as a fellow commoner. He made an extended visit to Pennsylvania after the Revolution, from 1783 to 1788. He rented a Philadelphia city house and designed and built a country house, The Solitude, which survives as part of the grounds of the Philadelphia Zoo.

He rebuilt the Penn mansion in the family estate of Stoke Park. He and his cousin also appealed to Parliament for compensation and they received a total of £4,000 annually in perpetuity.

In 1798, Penn was appointed High Sheriff of Buckinghamshire. He was a Member of Parliament for Helston from 1802 to 1805.

In 1805, he was appointed as governor of the Isle of Portland, where he built Pennsylvania Castle and later the sea bathing stone bath known as John Penn's Bath, close to the gardens of the castle.

In 1818, still a bachelor at 58, Penn founded the Matrimonial Society, soon renamed the Outinian Society to encourage young men and women to marry.

He died at age 74, unmarried, at Stoke Park in Stoke Poges. He was succeeded by his brother, Granville Penn.

Selected bibliography
The Battle of Eddington, or British Liberty, a tragedy
Some pamphlets
A collected volume of poems
Observations in Illustration of Virgil's Celebrated Fourth Eclogue (1810). This last title is a discussion of Virgil's "Fourth Eclogue," in which Penn reasons that Virgil's eclogue is not a prophecy of the birth of Jesus Christ, as others had argued, but a Genethliacon, a birthday-poem in honour of Octavius, who became Augustus Caesar. He received the degree of LL.D. from Cambridge in 1811.

See also
 List of colonial governors of Pennsylvania

References

External links

Biographical note

1760 births
1834 deaths
Alumni of Clare College, Cambridge
People of colonial Pennsylvania
Members of the Parliament of the United Kingdom for constituencies in Cornwall
People educated at Eton College
UK MPs 1802–1806
John
English people of Welsh descent
High Sheriffs of Buckinghamshire
Writers from London